Tanko Braimah (born 12 May 1979) is a Ghanaian sprinter who specialized in the 200 metres.

He competed at both the 2000 and 2004 Olympic Games, but without success. In 2000 he was disqualified in the 200 metres heats for lane infrigiment. In 2004 he competed in the 4 x 100 metres relay, but the team was knocked out in the heat.

His personal best times are 6.72 in the 60 metres, achieved in January 2006 in Ann Arbor, MI; 10.31 in the 100 metres, achieved in July 2003 in Ypsilanti, MI; and 20.62 seconds in the 200 metres, achieved in May 1999 in Clemson, SC.

External links

1979 births
Living people
Ghanaian male sprinters
Athletes (track and field) at the 2000 Summer Olympics
Athletes (track and field) at the 2004 Summer Olympics
Olympic athletes of Ghana
Athletes (track and field) at the 1998 Commonwealth Games
Commonwealth Games competitors for Ghana